Bellbird Park is a suburb in the City of Ipswich, Queensland, Australia. In the  Bellbird Park had a population of 6,736 people.

History
Kruger State School opened 23 January 1978 at Kruger Road at Redbank Plains, but suburb boundary changes means it is now in Bellbird Park.

In the 2011 census, Bellbird Park had a population of 5,031 people.

In the  Bellbird Park had a population of 6,736 people.

Bellbird Park State Secondary College opened in January 2017 for an initial intake of Year 7 students and by 2022 will be offering Year 7 through to Year 12.

Heritage Study
The Ipswich City Council's expanded heritage study identified the farmhouse Langley at 83 Johnstone Street as having significant cultural heritage. It was built for pioneers Alfred and Edith Josey in 1886.

Education 
Kruger State School is a government primary (Prep-6) school for boys and girls at Kruger Parade. In 2018, the school had an enrolment of 972 students with 69 teachers (66 full-time equivalent) and 38 non-teaching staff (27 full-time equivalent). It includes a special education program.

Bellbird Park State Secondary College is a government secondary (7-12) school for boys and girls at 2 Alesana Drive. In 2018, the school had an enrolment of 520 students with 46 teachers (45 full-time equivalent) and 16 non-teaching staff (12 full-time equivalent).

References

External links
 University of Queensland: Queensland Places: Bellbird Park

Suburbs of Ipswich, Queensland